State Highway 41 (SH 41) is a state highway that runs through the Texas Hill Country in Kerr, Real, and Edwards Counties.

History

SH 41 was proposed on April 22, 1919 as a route from north of Del Rio to Boerne via Rocksprings and Kerrville. On August 21, 1923, the designation was truncated to Mountain Home, with the section east of Mountain Home being transferred to SH 27. On May 23, 1951, the western section was transferred to U.S. Highway 377, shortening the route to its present length. On May 1, 1972, SH 41 was extended from SH 27 to I-10.

Major intersections

References

041
Transportation in Edwards County, Texas
Transportation in Real County, Texas
Transportation in Kerr County, Texas